Mount Melleray Abbey is a Trappist monastery in Ireland, founded in 1833. It is situated on the slopes of the Knockmealdown Mountains, near Cappoquin, Diocese of Waterford.

It is famous in literature due to Seán Ó Ríordáin's poem Cnoc Mellerí in Eireaball Spideoige (1952).  James Joyce mentions Mount Melleray in "The Dead", the final short story of his 1914 collection Dubliners. The monks are noted for their exceptional hospitality and piety.

History
The Cistercian order itself dates back to the 12th century and the Trappists to the mid-17th century.

Following the suppression of monasteries in France after the French Revolution, some dispossessed Trappist monks had arrived in England in 1794 and established a monastic community in Lulworth, Dorset. The monks returned to France in 1817 to re-establish the ancient Melleray Abbey in Brittany, following the restoration of the Bourbons. Within ten years, the restored monastery had two hundred members, of whom up to seventy were Irish. During the July Revolution of 1830, the monks were again persecuted and Waterford-born Father Vincent Ryan was sent by Dom Antoine, Abbot of Melleray. to found an abbey in Ireland.

Father Vincent initially rented a property in Rathmore, Co. Kerry. Sixty-four Cisterican monks landed at Cobh from France on 1 December 1831. The land in Rathmore proved unsuitable for housing the monastery and Fr Vincent looked to Co. Waterford, where Sir Richard Keane of Cappoquin had offered a tract of 600 acres of barren mountain land.

The monastery was founded on 30 May 1832 at Scrahan, Cappoquin. In the work of reclaiming the soil, the brethren were assisted by the local people. A number of "work pilgrimages" were undertaken by members of nearby parishes, the first by the parish of Modeligo.

On the feast of St Bernard, 1833, the foundation stone of the new monastery was blessed by Dr. William Abraham, Bishop of Waterford and Lismore. It was called Mount Melleray in memory of the motherhouse. In 1835 the monastery was created an abbey, and Father Vincent, unanimously elected, received the abbatial blessing from Bishop Abraham, this being the first abbatial blessing in Ireland since the Protestant Reformation.  It was from Mount Melleray that a small colony of monks was dispatched to found the English Mount Saint Bernard Abbey in 1835. Abbot Vincent vigorously undertook the work of completing the abbey, but died 9 December 1845.

His successor, Dom M. Joseph Ryan, resigned after two years. To Dom Bruno Fitzpatrick, who succeeded as abbot in September 1848, it remained to consolidate. He devoted his energy to missionary work (see below). Building resumed in the late 1920s when Dom Marius O'Phelan bought the great cut limestone blocks from Mitchelstown Castle (28 miles west), which had been burnt by the local IRA on 12 August 1922. In 1925, the owners of Mitchelstown castle dismantled the ruins and the stones were transported from Mitchelstown by steam lorry, two consignments a day for at least five years. As the Abbey was being laid out, Dom Marius died and his successor, Dom Celsus O'Connell, continued to the monumental task. He opted for a more prominent site directly over the mortal remains of 180 of his fellow Cistercians. The monks ended up with far more stones than they needed and these were eventually stacked in fields around the monastery.

In 1838 Daniel O'Connell, visited the Abbey, O'Connell was a supporter of Fr. Vincent, in establishing a Cistercian community in Ireland.

In 1849, Dom Bruno Fitzpatrick, who had become abbot the previous year founded New Melleray Abbey, near Dubuque, Iowa, U.S.A., and, in 1878, Mount Saint Joseph Abbey, Roscrea, Co. Tipperary, Ireland. He also founded the Ecclesiastical Seminary of Mount Melleray. Originating in a small school formed by Abbot Vincent in 1843, it was developed by Abbot Bruno and his successors.

During his July 1849 visit to neighbouring Dromana House, Scottish essayist Thomas Carlyle paid a visit to Mount Melleray and described the abbey in some detail, noting particularly the huge vats of "stir-about" or porridge the monks prepared for a large number of famine refugees that waited for food at the entrance to the monastery: "Entrance; squalid hordes of beggars, sit waiting" and "nasty tubs of cold stirabout (coarsest I ever saw) for beggars"(p. 90). He notes that the monastery "must have accumulated several thousand pounds of property in these seventeen ... years, in spite of its continual charities to beggars" (p. 92). Reminiscences of My Irish Journey in 1849. Thomas Carlyle, 1882.

In 1900 five stones with Ogham letters carved into them, which were found in 1857 (The Kilgrovan Stones) were transferred to the Abbey by Rev. Dr. Patrick Power.

Abbot Bruno died 4 December 1893, and was succeeded by Dom Carthage Delaney, who was blessed 15 January 1894, and presided over Mount Melleray for thirteen years; his successor was Dom Marius O'Phelan, solemnly blessed by Dr. Sheahan, Bishop of Waterford, 15 August 1908. Dom O'Phelan is credited with resuming the building programme at Mount Melleray in 1925.

In 1954 six monks (eight more in 1955) went to found a small Trappist abbey in a remote, rural area of New Zealand, the Southern Star Abbey.

Dom Eamon Fitzgerald, abbot of Mount Melleray, was elected abbot general of the order in September 2008.

Abbots
 Dom Vincent de paul Ryan (1833-1845) - prior and founder of the abbey
 Dom Joseph Mary Ryan (1846-1848)
 Dom Bartholomew (Bruno) Fitzpatrick (1848-1893)
 Dom John (Carthage) Delaney (1894-1908)
 Dom Richard (Marius) O'Phelan (1908-1931)
 Dom Stanislaus Hickey OSOC, BA(RUI) (1931-1933)
 Dom Celsus O'Connell (1933-1957) - formerly Abbot of Mount St Bernard Abbey
 Dom Finbar Cashman (1957-1971)
 Dom Pól Ó hAonusa (Paul Hennessy) OCSO (1971–75) 
 Dom Edward Ducey (1976-1980) - he had earlier founded New Mellifont Abbey in Co. Louth
 Dom Justin MacCarthy (1980-1989)
 Dom Eamon Fitzgerald (1989 - 2008) - appointed Abbot General of the Cistercians worldwide.
 Dom Augustine McGregor (2010-2014) - previously Abbot at New Mellifont (2004-2010)
 Br. Boniface McGinley OCSO acting abbot
 Dom Richard Purcell (2017–2021) previously Abbot of Mount St. Josephs Roscrea (2009-2017).

Boarding school
Since its early days, Mount Melleray educated both clerical and lay students. In 1972 it was announced that the boarding school was to close and it closed in 1974. In June 2019 the Mount Mellery College Past Pupils held its reunion in Melleray.

In 1977 the Catholic Boy Scouts of Ireland held its jubilee celebrations at Mount Melleray and in 1979 the former boarding school was acquired by the organisation, now part of Scouting Ireland, and developed it into the Mount Melleray National Scout and Activity Centre.

Past pupils of Mount Melleray College
 Tom Hayes - former minister of state, senator and TD for South Tipperary
 Bishop Clement Smyth — first prior of New Melleray Abbey
 Bishop James O’Gorman - second prior of New Melleray Abbey
 Bishop John Carroll DD - Bishop of Lismore, Australia
 Bishop Jeremiah Doyle DD - Irish missionary in Australia who became a Bishop of Lismore
 Dom Eamon Fitzgerald OCSO - the first Irishman to serve as Abbot General of the order of Cistercians
 William Henry Grattan Flood - author, composer and musicologist, student from (1872-1876)
 Michael Hurley SJ, teacher, theologian, and co-founder of the Irish School of Ecumenics
 Bishop James Maher DD (1840-1905) - Bishop of Port Augusta, Australia (1896-1905)
 Bartholomew MacCarthy - Historian and Irish Language Scholar
 Bishop Daniel Mullins (1929-2019) - Bishop in the Archdiocese of Cardiff (1987-2001)
 Msgr. Michael Olden - former president of Maynooth College
 Canon Michael Kennedy Ryan - priest, teacher, and Chairman of Thurles G.A.A. Club

See also
 List of abbeys and priories in Ireland (County Waterford)
 Mount St. Joseph Abbey, Roscrea / Cistercian College, Roscrea - Abbey and Secondary School, which Mount Mellary was the parent abbey.
 Portglenone Abbey (Bethlehem Abbey), Co. Antrim.
 Bolton Abbey, Moone, Co Kildare.
 Mellifont Abbey, Collon, Co Louth.

References 

Attribution

External links
 Mount Melleray Abbey website
 Mount Melleray Past Pupils' Union (archived 2006)

Religious buildings and structures in County Waterford
1833 establishments in Ireland
Trappist monasteries in the Republic of Ireland
Cistercian monasteries in the Republic of Ireland